Sarmak is a village in Tasuj Rural District of Shonbeh and Tasuj District of Dashti County, Bushehr province, Iran. At the 2006 census, its population was 293 in 66 households. The following census in 2011 counted 298 people in 70 households. The latest census in 2016 showed a population of 291 people in 89 households; it was the largest village in its rural district.

References 

Populated places in Dashti County